Matt Reid and John-Patrick Smith were the defending champions but only Reid chose to defend his title, partnering Steven de Waard. Reid lost in the first round to Andrew Harris and Christopher O'Connell.

Alex Bolt and Bradley Mousley won the title after defeating Evan King and Nathan Pasha 6–4, 6–2 in the final.

Seeds

Draw

References
 Main Draw

Latrobe City Traralgon ATP Challenger - Doubles
2017 Doubles